Misplaced is the sixth studio album by Jewish rock band Moshav. It was produced by Ron Aniello and mixed by Brendan O'Brien, and was released on August 8, 2006 by Jewish Music Group.

Production
The album was produced by Ron Aniello and David Kopp and mixed by Brendan O'Brien, with engineering by Trina Shoemaker and Clif Norrell. In addition to Moshav, the album features accompaniment by pianist Aaron Embry, guitarist C Lanzbom of Soulfarm, and drummer Matt Chamberlain of Critters Buggin. Musically, the album expands on the band's previously established folk sound with elements of worldbeat and the use of electronic effects.

Release and reception
The album was released on August 8, 2006. Hal Horowitz of AllMusic gave it 3.5 out of 5 stars, saying, "Some material is a bit undercooked and/or sappy, but in general this makes an excellent introduction to a group that, along with Matisyahu, has the talent to introduce the Western world to a vibrant and innovative combination of styles." Ben Jacobson of The Jerusalem Post named it one of the best Jewish albums of 5767 (2006-2007), saying the band had "finally made good on their threat to make it big in the New World with this effort...Every spiritual guitar pop song is pushed to its dramatic edge."

Track listing
"The Only One" (David Kopp) – 3:54
"Closer" – 4:19
"When I'm Gone" (Ron Aniello) – 4:33
"Misplaced" – 3:58
"Cold Cry" (Aniello) – 3:33
"Hallelu" (Kopp) – 2:49
"Lift Up Your Head" (Aniello) – 4:37
"The Streets of Jerusalem" (Larry John McNally) – 3:27
"Jockey Full of Bourbon" (Tom Waits cover) – 3:18
"Heart Is Open" – 3:46
"Stand Up" (Aniello) – 2:53
"Abba Shimon" – 4:56
"Dream Again" (Aniello) – 2:08

Personnel

Moshav Band
 Yehuda Solomon – lead vocals, percussion
 Duvid Swirsky – vocals, guitar, bass, percussion
 Yosef Solomon – bass

Additional musicians
 Ron Aniello – bass, guitar, keyboards
 C Lanzbom – guitar
 Aaron Embry – melodica, piano, zither
 Nimrod Nol – violin
 Jagonnathan Ramaamoorthy – violin 
 Jesse E. String – cello
 Matt Chamberlain – drums, percussion
 Gidon Shikler – percussion, backing vocals

Technical personnel

 Ron Aniello – composer, engineer, management, mixing, producer
 David Kopp – composer, producer, programming
 Brendan O'Brien – mixing
 Trina Shoemaker – engineer
 Clif Norrell – engineer
 C Lanzbom – engineer
 Jay Goin – engineer
 Todd Spitzer – engineer
 Kenny Takahashi – engineer
 Larry John McNally – composer
 Joey Peters – engineer, programming, project assistant
 Glenn Pittman – assistant engineer
 James Rudder – engineer
 Ian Suddarth – assistant engineer
 Tom Syrowski – assistant engineer
 Summer Ray Brown – project assistant
 Lori Carfora – project assistant
 Richard Foos – project assistant
 Leonard Korobkin – project assistant
 Joshua Mazalian – project assistant
 David McLees – project assistant
 Patrick Milligan – project assistant
 Deborah Radel – project assistant
 Yehuda Remer – project assistant
 Dean Schachtel – project assistant
 Candy Shipley – project assistant
 Stuart Wax – project assistant

References

2006 albums
Moshav (band) albums
Albums produced by Ron Aniello